The Franchise Affair is a 1951 British thriller film directed by Lawrence Huntington and starring Michael Denison, Dulcie Gray, Anthony Nicholls and Marjorie Fielding. It is a faithful adaptation of the novel The Franchise Affair by Josephine Tey.

Plot
In a quiet English town, 14-year-old schoolgirl Betty Kane (Ann Stephens) claims that the owners of an isolated house ("The Franchise"), spinster Marion Sharpe (Dulcie Gray) and Marion's mother (Marjorie Fielding), kidnapped and beat her. The police believe Betty's story, but local lawyer Robert Blair (Michael Denison), a bachelor, is sceptical. Risking ostracism from the community, Blair quietly sets about proving the innocence of the two women. The community begin to shun the women as they have already effectively been tried by the local press. Attacks on the house begin: breaking windows and painting graffiti on the walls. A local garage mechanic (Kenneth More) offers to help guard the house.

It eventually emerges that Betty was claiming to be 19 and having an affair with a travelling salesman. She planned to explain her absence by a kidnap and chose "The Franchise" house, having seen it over the high wall from the top of a double decker bus.

Lawyer Blair asks Marion to marry him, but she declines and after the trial she and her mother go to fly away to Canada. However Robert is sitting in the seat behind her on the plane and surprises them both.

Cast

Critical reception
The New York Times wrote, "a great many words are spoken and a great deal of tea is consumed in a low-budget British picture, "The Franchise Affair," which made a bedraggled appearance at the Little Carnegie yesterday. And, as may be readily imagined, the sum total of it all is an hour and a half of sheer boredom, unrelieved by any action or surprise."
Sky Movies wrote, "a neat, well-constructed whodunit - or, rather, was-it-done? - graced by good performances - it was one of several films husband-and-wife team Michael Denison and Dulcie Gray made together - and a leisurely but literate script. Although modest in ambition, the film sustains its drama throughout and there are some fine moments of spicy, English upper-crust wit. Its courtroom scenes also bring a welcome relief from the Perry Mason style of histrionics. Star-spotters can't miss Kenneth More in a small role."

References

External links

1951 films
1950s thriller films
Films directed by Lawrence Huntington
British thriller films
British black-and-white films
Films shot at Associated British Studios
1950s English-language films
1950s British films